The Wanamaker, Kempton & Southern, Inc. (WK&S) is a privately owned heritage railroad company in Kempton, Pennsylvania. The company was founded in 1963 and operates over an isolated remnant of a former Reading Company line. Its nickname is the Hawk Mountain Line due to its proximity to the Hawk Mountain range.

Operations
Its Kempton station is not the original one, but consists of buildings from the Reading Company that were brought to their current location. The ticket office was the original station at Joanna, Pennsylvania.

The company owns a shop building and an additional  of track south of Kempton.

History
The origins of the Wanamaker, Kempton & Southern date back to 1870 with the charter of a new railroad, the Berks County Railroad. In a very short time, the new line was bankrupt. It went to the Philadelphia and Reading Railroad as the renamed the Schuylkill and Lehigh line, a small branch line from Reading to Slatedale where the Reading connected with the Lehigh Valley Railroad. With the decline of railroads the Reading Company filed abandonment of the Schuylkill and Lehigh line. In 1963 a group of volunteers founded the Wanamaker, Kempton & Southern Railroad with its main purpose to preserve railroad history. The original plan for the line was to operate  of track from Kempton to Germansville. However this did not happen because an uncooperative land owner forced the new railroad to stop where the owner's land started, which is why the railroad stops just a north of Wanamaker along Route 143. The new railroad purchased  of track for $65,000. After the rest of the line was abandoned, the tracks south of Kempton were next on the list to be scrapped, but the WK&S had no money to purchase the line. However, the scrapper donated  of track south of Kempton. The end of the line to the south became North Albany.

Motive power

Steam
 0-6-0 H.K. Porter steam engine #65 (1930): Being rebuilt to be brought up to FRA code and will return to service within a couple of years.
 0-4-0 Porter steam engine #2 (1920): No future plans.

Diesel
 General Electric diesel-electric engine 44 tonner #7258 (1941)
 Whitcomb diesel-electric #602 (1944)
 General Electric diesel-electric #734 (1956): Restoration completed in 2010. Received as result of a trade with Railway Restoration Project 113 for Jersey Central business car 98.

Unrestored or gone
 2-6-2 Baldwin steam engine #4 (1914): Purchased in 2008. Will be restored to operation.
 2-6-2 steam Baldwin steam engine #250 (1926): no longer on the line and is on display at the Edaville Railroad, located at Edaville USA in South Carver, Massachusetts.

Gallery

See also

 List of heritage railroads in the United States

References

External links

 
 Detailed web site

Heritage railroads in Pennsylvania
Tourist attractions in Berks County, Pennsylvania
Railway companies established in 1963
1963 establishments in Pennsylvania
Spin-offs of the Reading Company